Imam Ibrahim Noonan, is an Irish  Imam to the Ahmadiyya Muslim community. Noonan is Imam of the Ahmadiyya Muslim Association Ireland and is based in Galway at the Galway Mosque.

Born in County Waterford, and raised a Roman Catholic, Noonan converted to Islam while living in London, he converted to Islam after reading Murder in the Name of Allah, by the 4th Caliph. He has studied in Pakistan, and the Jamia Ahmadiyya UK institute of Theology, and at the Dominican The Priory Institute in Tallaght, qualifying with a degree in Theology and Philosophy. Studied at Trinity college Dublin Intercultural Theology and interreligious studies Mphil,  currently pursuing a PhD.

References

1965 births
Irish Ahmadis
Irish former Christians
Converts to Islam from Roman Catholicism
People from County Waterford
Alumni of Institute of Technology, Tallaght
Living people